Webster Pass is a snow pass in central Bear Peninsula located at the divide between Brush Glacier and Holt Glacier, on Walgreen Coast, Marie Byrd Land. Mapped by United States Geological Survey (USGS) from U.S. Navy aerial photographs taken 1966. Named by Advisory Committee on Antarctic Names (US-ACAN) in 1977 after William O. Webster, U.S. Navy aerographer on seven Operation Deepfreeze deployments, including one winter.

Mountain passes of Antarctica
Landforms of Marie Byrd Land